Emmanuel Fernandes Francou (born 31 January 1986 in Villa Sarmiento) is an Argentine football player, who plays for Agropecuario Argentino.

Fernandes Francou started his career in Vélez Sársfield, after becoming the all-time leading top-scorer in the Vélez youth divisions; scoring a total of 118 goals. Unable to find space in the first team, he was loaned to Olimpia (in Paraguay), Talleres and Gimnasia de Jujuy, both of these in the Argentine second division. Fernandes Francou was released from his contract with Vélez in 2010.
Manager Player Marcos Garzia Argentine Manager Players.From 2010 till June 2012 Francou played for Asteras Tripolis in Greek Superleague. In September 2012 he signed in AEL 1964 FC as free agent in order to help the greatest provincial team in Greece to return in Greek Superleague.

References

External links
 AEL 1964 FC Official
 Argentine Primera statistics at Fútbol XXI
 BDFA profile

1986 births
Living people
People from Morón Partido
Sportspeople from Buenos Aires Province
Argentine footballers
Club Atlético Vélez Sarsfield footballers
Club Olimpia footballers
Talleres de Córdoba footballers
Gimnasia y Esgrima de Jujuy footballers
Asteras Tripolis F.C. players
Argentine Primera División players
Super League Greece players
Argentine expatriate footballers
Argentine expatriate sportspeople in Greece
Argentine people of Greek descent
Expatriate footballers in Paraguay
Expatriate footballers in Greece
Association football forwards